Bojan Mamić (born 13 September 1981) is a Serbian footballer who most recently played for Parnahyba.

Club career
Mamić represented a number of clubs in the Serbian lower leagues around the city of Belgrade. He was prolific in his goal scoring during this period.

In 2006, Mamić moved away from Serbia for the first time to Minsk, the capital of Belarus. Playing for MTZ-RIPO Minsk, Mamić made 36 appearances and scored 6 goals. He also had his first taste of European competition at MTZ-RIPO Minsk, playing in the UEFA Intertoto Cup as his club attempted to secure a UEFA Europa League place. In those two UEFA Intertoto Cup matches Mamić scored two goals.

Mamić's good form at the Belarusian club saw him transferred to Lithuanian top flight side FK Atlantas, in 2008. It was a short stay at the Klaipėda club, before he was transferred to another Lithuanian club FBK Kaunas in Lithuania's second city Kaunas. Mamić spent eight eventful months at FBK Kaunas in 2008, and had his first opportunity to play in the UEFA Champions League qualifying matches. FBK Kaunas were eliminated from the competition and were drawn against Italian club U.C. Sampdoria in the knockout rounds of the UEFA Europa League.

Mamić joined Hungarian National Championship I side Ferencvárosi TC in July 2009.

Mamić joined Brazilian club Parnahyba after playing for Maltese club Mqabba. Mamić trained with the Parnahyba SC squad in 2016 pre season, but never played a game for them. Instead he decided to retire from football and go ahead with his football academy full time.

In total Mamić played for over 20 clubs during his professional career.

After Football

Coaching
Mamić holds a UEFA level B Diploma in coaching.

Kids United Parnaíba Academy
After retiring as a player in 2016, Mamić founded his football academy, in the town of Parnaíba in the North East of Brazil.

The academy is for kids in the 5-17 age range and currently has 150 students, making it the biggest football academy in the town. Mamić coaches them speaking English and Portuguese.

Personal life
Mamić speaks Serbian, English, Portuguese, Spanish and Russian.

References

External links
 Kids United Parnaiba Facebook page
 
 

1981 births
Living people
Footballers from Belgrade
Serbian footballers
Association football forwards
Serbian expatriate footballers
Expatriate footballers in Belarus
Expatriate footballers in Lithuania
Expatriate footballers in Hungary
Expatriate footballers in Bahrain
Expatriate footballers in Malta
Expatriate footballers in Kazakhstan
Expatriate footballers in Thailand
Expatriate footballers in Vietnam
Expatriate footballers in Brazil
Serbian expatriate sportspeople in Belarus
Serbian expatriate sportspeople in Lithuania
Serbian expatriate sportspeople in Hungary
Serbian expatriate sportspeople in Bahrain
Serbian expatriate sportspeople in Malta
Serbian expatriate sportspeople in Kazakhstan
Serbian expatriate sportspeople in Thailand
Serbian expatriate sportspeople in Vietnam
Serbian expatriate sportspeople in Brazil
FK Mladi Obilić players
FK Obilić players
FK Timok players
FK Rad players
FK Voždovac players
OFK Mladenovac players
FC Partizan Minsk players
FK Atlantas players
FBK Kaunas footballers
Ferencvárosi TC footballers
FK Mladi Radnik players
Mqabba F.C. players
FC Kaisar players
Bojan Mamic
SHB Da Nang FC players
Żebbuġ Rangers F.C. players
Parnahyba Sport Club players
Belarusian Premier League players
A Lyga players
Nemzeti Bajnokság I players
Kazakhstan Premier League players